Melcon Peak is an ice-covered peak rising to   south of Shapeless Mountain in Victoria Land, Antarctica. There is exposed rock on the south side of this wedge-shaped elevation. The peak was named by the Advisory Committee on Antarctic Names (2004) after Mark ("Commander") Melcon, a McMurdo Station carpenter who worked 23 field seasons in Antarctica.

References

Mountains of Victoria Land
Scott Coast